Governor Turnbull may refer to:

Richard Turnbull (colonial governor) (1909–1998), Governor of Tanganyika from 1958 to 1961
Roland Evelyn Turnbull (1905–1960), Governor of North Borneo from 1954 to 1959